1st Independent Division of Shandong Provincial Military District was formed on August 8, 1966. The division was composed of three infantry regiments (1st to 3rd) and an artillery regiment.

In October 1976 the division was renamed as Independent Division of Shandong Provincial Military District following 2nd Independent Division of Shandong Provincial Military District's disbandment.

The division was disbanded in October 1981.

References

Independent Shandong
Military units and formations established in 1966
Military units and formations disestablished in 1981